AHM may refer to:

Arts and media
 Atom Heart Mother, a 1970 album by Pink Floyd
 "Atom Heart Mother" (suite), the title song of the album
 All Hail Megatron, a series of Transformers comics by IDW Publishing; see The Transformers (IDW Publishing)

People
Ahm (surname), list of people with the surname

Other uses
 Adventist Heritage Ministry
 American Home Mortgage
 American Honda Motor Company
 Ashland Municipal Airport, Ashland, Oregon, US
 Asset health management
 Attribute Hierarchy Method
 Mobu language
 All-Hands Meeting (typically in a corporation)